Club Baloncesto Santurtzi Saskibaloia Kluba is a professional basketball team based in Santurtzi, Basque Country, Spain. It was founded in 1987. From 2009 to 2011, the team played LEB Plata.

In 2011, Santurtzi resigned to their spot in LEB Plata due to having insufficient support.

Season by season

References

External links
Official website

Basque basketball teams
Basketball teams established in 1987
Liga EBA teams
Former LEB Plata teams
Sport in Biscay